West Virginia's 6th congressional district is an obsolete district existing from 1917 to 1963. The district's bounds changed greatly over the years, but its last version focused on the capital city of Charleston and some safe Democratic territory running south of that city to Beckley.  Today the state has two districts, the 1st covering the southern half of the state and the 2nd the northern half.

History
The 6th district was formed in 1916 after a period of two elections where the state elected an additional congressman "at large" in addition to the districts formed in 1902.  It consisted of Kanawha, Boone, Raleigh, Fayette, Greenbrier, and Pocahontas counties. In practical effect, it was the core of the previous 3rd district.  In 1934, Fayette, Greenbrier, and Pocahontas were removed and Logan was added.  The district was unchanged for 1952, and was abolished in 1962.

List of representatives

References

 Congressional Biographical Directory of the United States 1774–present

Former congressional districts of the United States
06
1917 establishments in West Virginia
1963 disestablishments in West Virginia